Autopsy is an American death metal band formed in Contra Costa County, California in 1987 by Chris Reifert and Eric Cutler. The group disbanded in 1995 and reunited in 2009.

History

Initial career
Autopsy was formed in August 1987 by Chris Reifert and Eric Cutler, shortly after Reifert's departure from Death. The band recorded a demo that year, Demo '87, before Danny Coralles joined in 1988 immediately prior to the recording of their second demo, Critical Madness, and along with Reifert and Cutler, would be a constant in the band's lineup. The band signed to Peaceville Records and released their debut album, Severed Survival in 1989. These early recordings featured a pioneering death metal style that adopted a slower, doom metal influenced sound. The next full-length, Mental Funeral, continued in this style and has since been cited by many other death metal musicians as particularly influential. Having completed a successful European tour soon after Mental Funeral, the band reentered the studio to record the Fiend for Blood EP, which was followed by their third full-length, Acts of the Unspeakable, which featured shorter songs and a more grindcore influenced sound. A difficult US tour in 1993 led to the decision to disband Autopsy after the recording of a final album. Shitfun, released in early 1995, was heavily influenced by hardcore punk and would prepare fans for Abscess, previously a side-project of Danny Coralles and Chris Reifert, which would become their main band after Autopsy's demise.

Autopsy was featured in the 2005 music documentary Metal: A Headbanger's Journey when the film's narrator and star, Sam Dunn read aloud a verse from the band's song "Charred Remains".

Reunion
After several years of speculation regarding an Autopsy reunion, and denial of the possibility, the band members briefly reunited in September 2008 to record two new tracks for the special edition of their 1989 debut Severed Survival. They later reconvened to the Maryland Deathfest in 2009. After Abscess broke up in June 2010, Autopsy immediately announced that they had permanently reunited. They released The Tomb Within EP in September 2010, Macabre Eternal in 2011, Born Undead DVD in 2012, The Headless Ritual in 2013 and Tourniquets, Hacksaws and Graves in 2014. Autopsy released the EP Skullgrinder on November 27, 2015. They released the EP Puncturing the Grotesque on December 15, 2017.

In December 2021, the band announced they were working on a new album, which was tentatively due for release in 2022. On July 27, 2022, the band revealed their new album, Morbidity Triumphant, would be released on September 30.

Legacy
Along with fellow Bay Area band Possessed and Reifert's previous group Death, Autopsy have been considered a pioneering band in the death metal genre. Early bands such as Entombed, Dismember, Gorefest, Immolation, Cannibal Corpse and Deicide have all credited Autopsy as an influence in their sound. In addition, Autopsy have helped to pioneer death-doom.

Band members

Current members
Chris Reifert – drums, lead vocals , bass 
Eric Cutler – guitars, backing and lead vocals , bass 
Danny Coralles – guitars , bass 
Greg Wilkinson – bass

Former members
Eric Eigard – bass 
Ken Sorvari – bass 
Steve Cutler – bass 
Josh Barohn – bass 
Freeway Migliore – bass 
 Joe Trevisano – bass

Session musicians
Steve Di Giorgio – bass 
Clint Bower – bass

Live members
Dan Lilker – bass

Timeline

Discography

Studio albums
 Severed Survival (1989)
 Mental Funeral (1991)
 Acts of the Unspeakable (1992)
 Shitfun (1995)
 Macabre Eternal (2011)
 The Headless Ritual (2013)
 Tourniquets, Hacksaws and Graves (2014)
 Morbidity Triumphant (2022)

EPs/Singles
 Retribution for the Dead (1991)
 Fiend for Blood (1991)
 Horrific Obsession (2009)
 The Tomb Within (2010)
 Skull Grinder (2015)
 Puncturing the Grotesque (2017)

Live albums
 Tortured Moans of Agony (1998)
 Dead as Fuck (2004)
 Dark Crusades (2010)
 Live in Chicago (2020)

Demos
 1987 Demo (1987)
 Critical Madness (1988)

Compilations
 Ridden with Disease (2000)
 Torn from the Grave (2001)
 All Tomorrow's Funerals (2012)
 Introducing Autopsy (2013)

Re-releases
  Severed Survival/Retribution for the Dead  (1994)
  Acts of the Unspeakable/Fiend for Blood  (2003)

Filmography
 Dark Crusades (with liner notes and band interview by Joel McIver; Peaceville Records, 2006)
 Born Undead (produced by Jesse Davis; Peaceville Records, 2012)

References

External links

 Official Autopsy page at Myspace

1987 establishments in California
Death metal musical groups from California
Musical groups established in 1987
Musical groups disestablished in 1995
Musical groups reestablished in 2009
Musical quartets